The list of ship launches in 1900 includes a chronological list of some ships launched in 1900.


References 

Sources

1900
Ship launches